The Ferret (French: Le furet) is a 1950 French crime film directed by Raymond Leboursier and starring Jany Holt, Colette Darfeuil and Pierre Renoir. It was based on a novel by Stanislas-André Steeman. It features the character of Inspector Wens, who had appeared in several other films including The Murderer Lives at Number 21. Location shooting took place around Paris including the city's Orly Airport. The film's sets were designed by the art director Roland Quignon.

Synopsis
A mysterious figure signing himself "The Ferret" keeps sending letters to the police, tipping them off about murders that are to be committed around Paris. Among those caught up in the police manhunt is a fraudulent clairvoyant.

Main cast
 Jany Holt as Cécile 
 Colette Darfeuil as Louise Heller  
 Pierre Renoir as Le docteur Darvel-Juste  
 Jacques Baumer as Commissaire Hyacinthe  
 Jean-Jacques Delbo as Ludovic  
 Pierre Larquey as Monsieur Thiais  
 Jean Tissier as Monsieur de Thomaz  
 Jacqueline Delubac as Madame de Lanier  
 Charles Dechamps as Lecartier  
 Marguerite Deval as Madame Chapuis  
 Pierre Jourdan as L'inspecteur Wens

References

Bibliography 
 Goble, Alan. The Complete Index to Literary Sources in Film. Walter de Gruyter, 1999.

External links 
 

1950 films
French crime films
1950 crime films
1950s serial killer films
1950s French-language films
Films directed by Raymond Leboursier
Films set in Paris
Films based on Belgian novels
French black-and-white films
1950s French films
Films based on works by Stanislas-André Steeman
Films shot in Paris